Hermano is an American stoner rock band formed in 1998.

History 
Formed by producer Dandy Brown as a side project in 1998, the original lineup consisted of vocalist John Garcia (Kyuss, Unida, Slo Burn), bassist Dandy Brown, drummer Steve Earle (Afghan Whigs) and guitarists Mike Callahan (Earshot) and David Angstrom (Supafuzz). After passing tapes and CDs amongst each other for six months, the band members entered the studio in early 1999 to begin recording their debut album. The record was completed in the early 2000; however, it was another two years before it was released, due to an assortment of contractual obligations.

The band released Only a Suggestion on Tee Pee Records in 2002. The release was followed by some brief touring in North America and Europe. During this period, drummer Steve Earle was replaced by Supafuzz drummer Chris Leathers; Leathers joined the band for the first time at the Azkena Festival in Spain in 2003.

Hermano signed to Dutch label Suburban Records and released Dare I Say in 2005.

In 2005, the band released Live at W2, a live CD from their Angry American tour. It was followed by a DVD of the show in 2006.

Hermano released their third album Into the Exam Room in late 2007, and followed the release with tours of Europe.

In 2022, it was announced Hermano had signed to Ripple Music and will release an exclusive 10" album on the label, along with reissues of all previously released albums.

Members
Current members
John Garcia – vocals (1998–present)
Dandy Brown – bass (1998–present)
Mike Callahan – guitar (1998–present)
David Angstrom – guitar (1998–present)
Chris Leathers – drums (2003–present)

Former members
Steve Earle – drums (1998–2003)

Discography 
Studio albums
2002: ...Only a Suggestion (Tee Pee Records)
2004: Dare I Say... (MeteorCity Records)
2007: ...Into the Exam Room (Suburban Records)
Live albums
2005: Live at W2 (Suburban Records)

References

External links

 Band website (archived)

American hard rock musical groups
American stoner rock musical groups
1998 establishments in the United States
Musical groups established in 1998